V718 Coronae Australis (HD 171697; HR 6991; V718 CrA) is a solitary variable star located in the southern constellation Corona Australis. It is faintly visible to the naked eye as a red-hued point of light with an apparent magnitude of 5.43. At its current distance V718 CrA's brightness is diminished by 0.37 magnitudes due to interstellar dust and it has an absolute magnitude of −1.03.

This object was first noticed to be potentially variable by Olin J. Eggen in 1973. Its variability was confirmed in 1999 after subsequent observations and was given the variable star designation V718 Coronae Australis. Observations from Koen & Laney (2000) reveal that V718 CrA has two periods: one lasting 5.37 days and the other lasting 71.1 days. It is a slow irregular variable of subtype Lb that fluctuates between 5.45 and 5.51 in the Hipparcos passband.

V718 CrA has a stellar classification of M2 III, indicating that it is an evolved red giant. It is currently on the asymptotic giant branch, fusing hydrogen and helium shells around an inert carbon core. It has 1.45 times the mass of the Sun but it has expanded to 101 times the Sun's radius.

References

M-type giants
Asymptotic-giant-branch stars
Slow irregular variables
Corona Australis, V718
High-proper-motion stars
Corona Australis
Corona Australis, 18
CD-43 12699
171697
091494
6991